The year 1657 in science and technology involved some significant events.

Geography
 Peter Heylin publishes his Cosmographie, one of the earliest attempts to describe the entire world in English and the first known description of Australia.

Mathematics
 Christiaan Huygens writes the first book to be published on probability theory, De ratiociniis in ludo aleae ("On Reasoning in Games of Chance").

Medicine
 Walter Rumsey invents the provang, a baleen instrument which he describes in his Organon Salutis: an instrument to cleanse the stomach.

Technology
 Christiaan Huygens patents his 1656 design for a pendulum clock and the first example is made for him by Salomon Coster at The Hague.
 approx. date – The anchor escapement for clocks is probably invented by Robert Hooke.

Institutions
 Accademia del Cimento established in Florence.

Births
 February 11 – Bernard le Bovier de Fontenelle, French scientific populariser (died 1757)
 approx. date – Pierre-Charles Le Sueur, French fur trader and explorer (died 1704)

Deaths
 June 3 – William Harvey, English physician who discovered the circulation of blood (born 1578)
 June 16 – Fortunio Liceti, Italian Aristotelian scientific polymath (born 1577)
 September 23 – Joachim Jungius, German mathematician, logician and philosopher of science (born 1587)
 October 22 – Cassiano dal Pozzo, Italian scholar and patron (born 1588)
 November – John French, English physician and chemist (born c. 1616)

References

 
17th century in science
1650s in science